Corticaria elongata is a species of minute brown scavenger beetle in the family Latridiidae.

References

Further reading

 
 

Latridiidae
Articles created by Qbugbot
Beetles described in 1827